Dogar, Do Gar, Dowgar, or Duger may refer to:

Places
 Dowgar, Ardabil, a village in Ardabil Province, Iran
 Dogar, Ilam, a village in Ilam Province, Iran
 Düğer, Burdur, a village in Burdur Province, Turkey

Other uses 
Dogar, a Punjabi clan
Abdul Hameed Dogar (born 1944), Pakistani jurist
Mukhtar Ahmad Dogar (1922–2004), Pakistan Air Force bomber pilot and aerial warfare specialist
Irfan Dogar (born 1973), Pakistani politician

See also
Dogra